Fort Vermilion (Wop May Memorial) Aerodrome  is located  east northeast of Fort Vermilion, Alberta, Canada.

In 2018 the airport was named after Canadian Wop May, former bush pilot and WWI flying ace. It was to Fort Vermilion that May flew to in 1929 with lifesaving drugs.

References

External links

Page about this airport on COPA's Places to Fly airport directory

Registered aerodromes in Alberta
Mackenzie County